Psathyrophlyctis is a genus of lichenized fungi in family Phlyctidaceae (order Gyalectales). The genus is monotypic, containing the single species Psathyrophlyctis serpentaria, found in South Africa.

References

Gyalectales
Lichen genera
Gyalectales genera